Tetrisia is a genus of shield bugs belonging to the family Plataspidae. The same genus name was published as a new moth genus, Tetrisia, four months later by the same author, making the latter an invalid junior homonym, in need of formal replacement.

Species
 Tetrisia bruchoides Walker, 1867
 Tetrisia vacca Webb, 2004

References

Shield bugs
Pentatomomorpha genera